Campeones de la vida is an Argentine telenovela, produced by Pol-Ka, which was aired from 1999 to 2001 by El Trece. The main actors were Osvaldo Laport, María Valenzuela, Soledad Silveyra, Juan Carlos Calabró, Mariano Martínez, Jorgelina Aruzzi and Laura Azcurra. It received several Martín Fierro awards.

1990s Argentine television series
2000s Argentine television series
Pol-ka telenovelas
1999 telenovelas
2000 telenovelas
2001 telenovelas
1999 Argentine television series debuts
2001 Argentine television series endings
Television shows set in Buenos Aires